The following is a list of people born or associated with Iloilo and Iloilo City.

Arts, literature, and entertainment

Beauty pageants
 Rabiya Occeña Sundall Mateo – Miss Universe Philippines 2020 winner
 Pura Villanueva Kalaw – first Manila Carnival queen in 1908
 Angelia Ong – Miss Earth 2015 winner
 Anjanette Abayari – Binibining Pilipinas Universe 1991 winner

Film
 Nick Deocampo – film director, film historian
 Peter Solis Nery – film director, actor, producer, writer; Gugma sa Panahon sang Bakunawa (2012)

Literature
 Gilbert Luis R. Centina III – Palanca awardee
 Leoncio P. Deriada – Ilonggo Palanca awardee
 Magdalena Jalandoni – Hiligaynon poet, National Cultural awardee for Literature
 Ramon Muzones –  National Artist for Literature.
 Stevan Javellana – Ilonggo writer
 Peter Solis Nery – Ilonggo Palanca Awards Hall of Fame awardee; first Filipino author invited to the Sharjah International Book Fair
 Guillermo Gómez Rivera – Ilonggo writer
 Miguel Syjuco – winner of 2008 Man Asian Literary Prize

Performing arts

Music
 Emman Abatayo – singer, songwriter, Pinoy Dream Academy Season 1 scholar
 Jose Mari Chan – singer, songwriter
 Vehnee Saturno – record producer
 Nina Girado – singer
 Jed Madela – singer, songwriter
 Ruben Tagalog – Kundiman singer
 Young JV – singer, actor, model, and dancer
 Jhett Tolentino – singer, Grammy and Tony-award winning theatrical producer
 Beabadoobee – indie pop rock singer-songwriter and guitarist

TV and movie personalities
 Carla Abellana – actress, model, TV host and personality
 John Arcilla – actor
 Sharmaine Arnaiz – actress
 Claudine Barretto – actress
 Gretchen Barretto – actress
 Billy Crawford – actor, model, singer, TV host and personality 
 Dingdong Dantes – actor, model
 Charlie Davao – actor
 Sunshine Dizon – actress, model
 Gabb Drilon – actor
 Anita Linda – actress
 Ike Lozada – actor
 Edu Manzano – TV host, actor
 Luis Manzano – actor, model, TV host and personality
 Pokwang – actress, comedian
 Delia Razon – actress
 Paul Salas – actor
 Myrtle Sarrosa – Pinoy Big Brother Teen Edition 4 Big Winner
 Arthur Solinap – actor
 Prince Stefan (actor) – actor, model, and dancer
 Joy Viado – actress, comedian
 Marita Zobel – actress
 Dawn Zulueta – actress

Mass communications
 Billy Balbastro – radio broadcaster
 Karen Davila – main news anchor on the ABS-CBN News Channel programmers TV Patrol and Headstart with Karen Davila

Visual arts
 Romeo Villalva Tabuena – Filipino painter and printmaker
 The Scottish artists, Iain Macnab and Chica Macnab were both born in Iloilo

Business
 Eugenio Lopez, Sr. – former Chairman of the Lopez Group of Companies
 Eugenio Lopez, Jr. – former Chairman Emeritus of ABS-CBN
 Eugenio Lopez III – the 3rd generation Eugenio of the Lopez family; present Chairman of ABS-CBN
 Edgar Sia – founder of Mang Inasal and DoubleDragon Corporation
 Alfonso A. Uy – first President of Filipino-Chinese Chamber of Commerce and Industry from Visayas and Mindanao

Education
 Jose Cabalum, Sr. – educator
 William Valentine – American Protestant missionary and educator; founded Central Philippine University, the second American university in Asia

Government service

Executive service
 Teofisto Guingona, Jr. – former Senator and Vice President of the Philippines
 Fernando López – former Senator, Vice President of the Philippines, and Mayor of Iloilo City
Amelita Ramos – former First Lady of the Philippines; wife of former President Fidel Ramos
Liza Araneta Marcos – First Lady of the Philippines; wife of President Bongbong Marcos

Judiciary
 Ramón Avanceña – former Chief Justice of the Supreme Court of the Philippines and Vice President
 Carolina Griño-Aquino – former Associate Justice of the Supreme Court of the Philippines, Rank 1st 1950 Philippine Bar Examinations
 Gregorio Perfecto – former Associate Justice of the Supreme Court of the Philippines
 Florenz Regalado – former Associate Justice of the Supreme Court of the Philippines and record holder for the highest average in the Philippine Bar Examinations, with his 1954 mark of 96.7%
 Francis Jardeleza – former Associate Justice of the Supreme Court of the Philippines and Solicitor General of the Philippines
 Raul M. Gonzalez – former Secretary of Justice
 Gregorio S. Araneta – former Secretary of Finance and Justice, Attorney General of the Philippines, and Solicitor General of the Philippines

Legislators

Senators
 Tomas Confesor – Senator served in the 2nd Commonwealth Congress or 1st Congress of the Philippines, elected ranked 6th in the 1946 national elections, former Governor of Iloilo
 José María Arroyo – Senator from the Seventh Senatorial District
 Francisco Felipe Villanueva – Visayan delegate to the Malolos Congress, Senate majority floor leader during the Fourth Legislature in 1916–1919
 Nikki Coseteng – Senator, 8th Congress
 Miriam Defensor Santiago – Senator, 10th, 11th, 13th, 14th, 15th, and 16th Congress
 Franklin Drilon – Senator, 10th, 11th (Senate President), 12th (Senate President), 13th (Senate President), 15th, 16th (Senate President), and 17th (Senate President pro tempore) Congress
 Teofisto Guingona, Sr. – Senator, 4th Philippine Legislature
 Grace Poe-Llamanzares – Senator, 16th Congress of the Philippines
 Manuel Villar – Senator, 12th, 13th (Senate President), 14th (Senate President), 15th Congress
 Jose Zulueta – Senator and Senate President, 2nd Congress

House Representatives 

 Niel Tupas Jr. – former House Representatives of the 5th district of Iloilo
 Ferjenel Biron – former House Representatives of the 4th district of Iloilo
 Janette Garin – incumbent House Representatives of the 4th district of Iloilo, former Secretary of Health
 Richard Garin – former House Representatives of the 1st district of Iloilo and Vice Governor of Iloilo
 Judy Syjuco –  former House Representatives of the 2nd district of Iloilo
 Julienne Baronda – incumbent House Representatives of the lone district of Iloilo City

Local Government 

 Niel Tupas Sr. – former Governor of Iloilo and House Representatives of the 5th district of Iloilo
 Arthur Defensor Sr. – former Governor of Iloilo and House Representatives of the 3rd district of Iloilo
 Arthur Defensor Jr. – incumbent Governor of Iloilo, former House Representatives of the 3rd district of Iloilo
 Casimiro Andrada – 5th Municipal President of Balasan
 Isko Moreno – 27th Mayor of Manila and actor whose father originally hail from San Joaquin, Iloilo
 Jerry Treñas – incumbent Mayor of Iloilo City
 Jed Patrick Mabilog – former Mayor of Iloilo City

Military service
 Vicente Piccio, Jr. – former chief of the Philippine Air Force
 Ramona Go – First Female Brigadier General

Civil service 

 Resurreccion Borra – COMELEC Commissioner

Social sciences
 F. Landa Jocano – anthropologist and historian; documented the epic Hinilawod of the Panay Bukidnon of Iloilo
 Alicia P. Magos – anthropologist and historian; published and documented the culture of Western Visayas, especially the Panay Bukidnon

Innovators and scientists
 Alexis Belonio – engineer, inventor and winner of Rolex Award for Enterprise in 2008
 Josette Biyo – Intel Excellence for Teaching awardee in 2002; an asteroid was named after her, 13241 Biyo

Religious service
 Fernando Capalla – present Archbishop of Davao
 Eduardo Hontiveros – Filipino Jesuit composer and musician
 Angel Lagdameo – 5th Archbishop of Jaro and former President of Catholic Bishops' Conference of the Philippines
 Antonio Ledesma – Archbishop of Cagayan de Oro
 Jose S. Palma – present Archbishop of Cebu and President of Catholic Bishops' Conference of the Philippines
 Alberto Jover Piamonte – 4th Archbishop of Jaro
 Jaime Sin – 9th Archbishop of Jaro and 30th Archbishop of Manila
 Mother Rosario Arroyo de la Visitacion - Servant of God, founder Dominican Sisters of the Most Holy Rosary of the Philippines

Revolutionaries and war heroes
 Juan Araneta – led the Negros Revolution
 Ludovico Arroyo Bañas – World War II veteran, pioneer in Philippine telecommunications
 Jose Calugas – World War II Medal of Honor awardee
 Martin Teofilo Delgado – revolutionary hero, soldier, politician
 Adriano Hernandez – leader of the "Cry of Lincud", the first armed uprising for independence in the province of Iloilo
 Graciano Lopez Jaena – revolutionary hero, writer, editor, orator, and journalist, founder of La Solidaridad
 Aniceto Lacson – led the Negros Revolution
 Teresa Magbanua – the Joan of Arc of the Visayas
 Patrocinio Gamboa – revolutionary heroine, brought the Philippine flag to Sta. Barbara, where it was first raised outside the capital.

Sports
 Paulino Alcántara – international football player who played for FC Barcelona
 Angel Guirado Aldeguer – member of Philippine Azkals
 Ian Araneta – member of Philippine Azkals
 Kurt Bachmann – basketball player
 Ken Bono – PBA player
 Emelio Caligdong – Vice Captain of Philippine Azkals and 2012 The Outstanding Young Men (TOYM) awardee
 Anjo Caram – PBA player, former NCAA basketball player for San Beda Red Lions
 Denver Cuello – current WBC International minimumweight champion
 Kenneth Duremdes – PBA player
 Rudy Fernandez – amputee triathlete
 Emmanuel "Emman" Monfort – PBA player, former UAAP basketball player for the Ateneo Blue Eagles, former Ateneo de Iloilo-SMCS player Ateneo Blue Dragons
 Bong Ravena – PBA player
 Kiefer Ravena – UAAP basketball player for the Ateneo Blue Eagles
 Masunoyama Tomoharu – sumo wrestler
 Eugenio Torre – first Filipino and Asian Grandmaster
 Ronald Tubid – PBA player
 James Yap – PBA player, former ICCHS or Huasiong basketball player
 Wesley So – chess prodigy; youngest Filipino chess grandmaster
 Manuel Araneta Jr. – basketball player in 1948 Summer Olympics

Others 
 Nicholas Loney – 19th-century British diplomat and businessman who helped develop Iloilo City
 Perfecto R. Yasay, Jr. – former Securities and Exchange Commission (SEC) Chairman; 2010 Philippine Vice-Presidential candidate running alongside Eddie Villanueva along with John Gokongwei, Henry Sy, Wilfred Steven Uytengsu, Ramon S. Ang, Manny V. Pangilinan, Dennis Uy, Dioceldo Sy, Emilio Yap, and Juan Miguel Zubiri and finally the death, David Consunji.

References

Iloilo